A hyperbolic spiral is a plane curve, which can be described in polar coordinates by the equation

of a hyperbola. Because it can be generated by a circle inversion of an Archimedean spiral, it is called Reciprocal spiral, too.

Pierre Varignon first studied the curve in 1704. Later Johann Bernoulli and Roger Cotes worked on the curve as well.

The hyperbolic spiral has a pitch angle that increases with distance from its center, unlike the logarithmic spiral (in which the angle is constant) or Archimedean spiral (in which it decreases with distance). For this reason, it has been used to model the shapes of spiral galaxies, which in some cases similarly have an increasing pitch angle. However, this model does not provide a good fit to the shapes of all spiral galaxies.

In cartesian coordinates 
the hyperbolic spiral with the polar equation

can be represented in Cartesian coordinates  by

The hyperbola has in the -plane the coordinate axes as asymptotes. The hyperbolic spiral (in the -plane) approaches for  the origin as asymptotic point. For  the curve has an asymptotic line (see next section).

From the polar equation and  one gets a representation by an equation:

Geometric properties

Asymptote 
Because

the curve has an asymptote with equation .

Polar slope 

From vector calculus in polar coordinates one gets the formula  for the polar slope and its angle  between the tangent of a curve and the tangent of the corresponding polar circle.

For the hyperbolic spiral  the polar slope is

Curvature 
The curvature of a curve with polar equation  is

From the equation  and the derivatives  and  one gets the curvature of a hyperbolic spiral:

Arc length 

Sector area 
The area of a sector (see diagram above) of a hyperbolic spiral with equation  is:

Inversion 

The inversion at the unit circle has in polar coordinates the simple description: .

The image of an Archimedean spiral  with a circle inversion is the hyperbolic spiral with equation . At  the two curves intersect at a fixed point on the unit circle.

The osculating circle of the Archimedean spiral  at the origin has radius  (see  Archimedean spiral) and center . The image of this circle is the line  (see circle inversion). Hence the preimage of the asymptote of the  hyperbolic spiral with the inversion  of the Archimedean spiral is the osculating circle of the Archimedean spiral at the origin.

Central projection of a helix 

Consider the central projection from point  onto the image plane . This will map a point  to  the point .

The image under this projection of the helix with parametric representation

is the curve

with the polar equation

which describes a hyperbolic spiral.

For parameter  the hyperbolic spiral has a pole and the helix intersects the plane  at a point . One can check by calculation that the image of the helix as it approaches  is the asymptote of the hyperbolic spiral.

References

 Hans-Jochen Bartsch, Michael Sachs: Taschenbuch mathematischer Formeln für Ingenieure und Naturwissenschaftler, Carl Hanser Verlag, 2018, 9783446457072, S. 410.
 Kinko Tsuji, Stefan C. Müller: Spirals and Vortices: In Culture, Nature, and Science, Springer, 2019, 9783030057985, S. 96.
 Pierre Varignon: Nouvelle formation de Spirales – exemple II, Mémoires de l’Académie des sciences de l’Institut de France, 1704, pp. 94–103.
 Friedrich Grelle: Analytische Geometrie der Ebene, Verlag F. Brecke, 1861 hyperbolische Spirale, S. 215.
 Jakob Philipp Kulik: Lehrbuch der höhern Analysis, Band 2, In Commiss. bei Kronberger u. Rziwnatz, 1844, Spirallinien, S. 222.

External links

 Online exploration using JSXGraph (JavaScript)
 2dcurves "hyperbolic spiral" page

Spirals

pt:Espiral logarítmica